The Emperor Jones may refer to:

 The Emperor Jones, a play by Eugene O'Neill
 The Emperor Jones (1933 film), adaptation directed by Dudley Murphy
 The Emperor Jones (1938 film), adaptation produced by the BBC, starring Robert Adams
 The Emperor Jones (1953 TV film), adaptation produced by the BBC, starring Gordon Heath
 The Emperor Jones (1955 film), adaptation produced by the Kraft Television Theatre starring Ossie Davis
 The Emperor Jones (opera), a 1933 opera by Louis Gruenberg